Vaaloabi Engeynama is a 2006 Maldivian romantic film directed by Ahmed Nimal. Produced by Abdul Faththaah under Red Production, the film stars Yoosuf Shafeeu, Mariyam Afeefa, Fathimath Fareela and Ali Riyaz in pivotal roles. It was based on Aishath Neena's novel Viremundhaa Hiyy.

Premise
Ali Shiham (Yoosuf Shafeeu) was seven years old when his father died and his mother married to a heart patient, Abdul Rasheed (Koyya Hassan Manik) who hailed up them in good health and prosperity. Ever since, his daughter, Aminath Niha (Mariyam Afeefa) and Shiham spend time together and grew us best friends. On her father's deathbed, he wished both Shiham and Niha to marry each other which created an altercation between them. Shiham who is already in a relationship with Azu (Fathimath Fareela) agreed to marry Niha on a mutual understanding that their marriage is solely intended to please Niha's father and they will separate when he dies. As days pass by, Niha slowly feel herself being attracted to Shiham who is still in love with Azu. After Rasheed's funeral, Shiham decided to marry Azu without divorcing Niha since the latter is in a state of depression post her father's death. Complication arises when Shiham had to equally fulfill his responsibilities to both his wives.

Cast 
 Yoosuf Shafeeu as Ali Shiham
 Mariyam Afeefa as Aminath Niha
 Fathimath Fareela as Azu
 Ali Riyaz as Suja
 Fauziyya Hassan as Shareefa
 Koyya Hassan Manik as Abdul Rasheed
 Aishath Rasheedha as Azeeza
 Ibrahim Wisan as a camera-man (Special appearance)
 Ahmed Nimal as an advertisement director (Special appearance)

Soundtrack

Accolades

References

External links 
 

2006 films
Maldivian romantic drama films
Films directed by Ahmed Nimal